Asian American literature is the body of literature produced in the United States by writers of Asian descent. Asian American literature became a category during the 1970s but didn't see a direct impact in viewership until later in the 1970s. Perhaps the earliest references to Asian American literature appeared with David Hsin-fu Wand's Asian American Heritage: An Anthology of Prose and Poetry, published in 1974. One of the earlier pieces of Asian American literature produced by Combined Asian American Resources Project (CARP) was Aiiieeeee! An Anthology of Asian-American Writers (1974). This anthology collected staples of long-forgotten Asian American literature and criticized the lack of visibility of this literature. This anthology brought to light the necessity of visibility and criticism of Asian American literature; with visibility came recognition of new literature. Elaine Kim's seminal book of criticism, Asian American Literature: An Introduction to the Writings and Their Social Context, was published in 1982 and was the first critical book on the topic.

Since then, the field of Asian American literature and of Asian American literary criticism has grown remarkably. Numerous authors produce literary and critical work used, but defining "Asian American literature" remains a troublesome task. Most critics who have written about Asian American literature implicitly or explicitly define it as being written by Asian Americans, and usually about Asian Americans. This definition poses a number of problems that are an ongoing source of discussion for Asian American literary critics: Who is an Asian American? Is "America" only the United States, or does it include the rest of the Americas? If an Asian American writes about characters who are not Asian American, is this Asian American literature? If someone who is not Asian American writes about Asian Americans, is this Asian American literature? The fluidity of ethnicity and race can play a major role in culture and identity.

Characteristics and themes

Common themes in Asian American literature include race, culture, and finding a sense of identity. While these topics can be subjective, some of the pinpointed ideas tie into gender, sexuality, age, establishing traditional and adaptive culture, and Western racism towards Asians.

Long-standing traditions have played a major role in shaping the future of Asian Americans. Some literature touches upon the effects of traditional Asian culture on Asian Americans living in a more liberal country. The mindset induced as a result of this juxtaposition of cultures creates some extreme cognitive dissonance, particularly among women of Asian descent.

Authors also touch upon the lack of visibility and criticism of Asian American literature. Asian American writers were prominent before the 1970s, but as touched upon in Aiiieeeee!, their history is lacking. One of the questions is why Asian American literature was never exposed or taken seriously. It is possible that racism played a strong role in the perception of Asian authors in the United States and Asian Americans in general, but it is safe to assume there is not one single answer.

Throughout the 1990s there was a growing amount of Asian American queer writings (Merle Woo (1941), Willyce Kim (1946), Russell Leong (1950), Kitty Tsui (1952), Dwight Okita (1958), Norman Wong (1963), Tim Liu (1965), Chay Yew (1965) and Justin Chin (1969).) These authors interrogate the intersections between gender, sexuality, race and cultural traditions. They experience fragility due to both their ethnicity and their gender, or sexual orientation, but the "fragile status of their families’ economic success in ethnically hostile Asian environments seems to me to have more to do with their emigration and compounded alienations than most of the authors acknowledge."

Asian American identity

It wasn't until the late 1960s that the term "Asian American" was created in an attempt to advocate for political solidarity and cultural nationalism. When this term was coined, it allowed Asians in the United States to better identify as a subgroup with shared concerns as well as articulate their individuality. In 2000, the U.S. Census defined the term "Asian American" as anyone "with origins in any of the original peoples of the Far East, Southeast Asia, or the Indian subcontinent."

Visibility of Asian American literature

Asian American literature was finally categorized in the 1970s. It did not see a major resurgence until CARP's Aiiieeeee! An Anthology of Asian-American Writers (1974), edited by Frank Chin, Jeffery Paul Chan, Lawson Fusao Inada, and others. This anthology helped the field gain ground by recovering previous generations of Asian American authors. As a result, older authors such as Sam Tagatac and Toshio Mori have become prevalent again, gaining new exposure and publication. One of the defining features of CARP's anthology touched upon stereotypes of Asians as a whole: how published work did not receive criticism because the writing did not line up with racial views. This anthology paved a way for authors to write and express feelings of individual identity and crisis concerning racism. The anthology helped in the fight against cultural assimilation, which played a large role (model minority being the biggest example) in the day-to-day life of Asian Americans. However, some critics have challenged CARP's intentions by surfacing their hypocrisy, since the anthology's editors rejected the concept of dual personality and thereby rejected most foreign-born Asians.

Perhaps the most important figure in the recognition of Asian American literature as a legitimate literary field has been Maxine Hong Kingston, whose work has earned widespread notice. Born in Stockton, California as a second generation Chinese American, she published The Woman Warrior in 1976. This story cycle mixed fictional autobiography with Chinese folktales in an attempt to articulate the life of Chinese Americans and the process of self-identity in a liberal world. Her second novel, China Men (1980), is a sequel to The Woman Warrior and also describes the hardships of Chinese settlement in American culture. These two novels gained the attention of many, garnering more empathy and understanding for Chinese Americans. However, Kingston's success also aroused the ire of Frank Chin, who accused her of perpetuating falsehoods about Chinese culture and especially about Chinese and Chinese American men.

In addition to the talents of individual writers, multiple organizations were formed in hopes of achieving the same outcome as “Aiiieeeee! An Anthology of Asian-American Writers”. One of these organizations is the Association for Asian American Studies which was founded in 1979. The AAAS hopes to promote further understanding and professional activity in the field of Asian American Studies, including Asian American literature and literary criticism. There was some controversy. in 2013 regarding some of the decisions of AAAS to boycott Israeli academic institutions. Extending the theme of visibility to other ethnic and racial issues is a defining feature of the AAAS, but its main goal is advocacy and representation for Asian Americans.

Asian American Literary Awards

One of the problems associated with Asian American literature is the definition of "Asian American." The Asian American Literary Awards, presented by the Asian American Writers' Workshop, define eligibility "authors of Asian descent". While this definition is clear and concise, this has not stopped them from giving awards to those who have written about Asian Americans, while not being an Asian American. As the event developed, awards extended to groups outside of Asian descent, but the winners are still predominantly Asian. The Association for Asian American Studies (AAAS) has annually awarded Asian American writers at the Book Awards for their contributions in works regarding history, social science, poetry, and prose.

Asian American authors

There are plenty of Asian American authors before the 1970s. With the publication of Aiiieeeee! An Anthology of Asian-American Writers, there was a push for the surfacing of old and new Asian American writers.

Some key Asian American authors include: 

Carlos Bulosan
Frank Chin
Justin Chin (1969-2015)
Louis Chu
Sui Sin Far (1865-1914)
Jessica Hagedorn
David Henry Hwang
Gish Jen
Maxine Hong Kingston
Jhumpa Lahiri
Don Lee 
Chang-Rae Lee
Janice Mirikitani
Toshio Mori (1910-1980)
Bharati Mukherjee
Celeste Ng
Viet Thanh Nguyen
John Okada (1923-1971)
Han Ong
Ruth L. Ozeki
Shawna Yang Ryan
Bienvenido Santos
Lisa See
SJ Sindu
Amy Tan
le thi diem thuy
Adrian Tomine
Monique Truong
Onoto Watanna
Shawn Wong
Bryan Thao Worra
Hisaye Yamamoto (1921-2011)
Karen Tei Yamashita
Lois-Ann Yamanaka
Paul Yoon
Charles Yu
R. Zamora Linmark

See also
List of Asian American writers
Chinese American literature
List of American writers of Korean descent
Asian American Literary Awards
Asian/Pacific American Awards for Literature

References

External links
 

 
American literature by ethnic background
Asian-American culture